Yeru or Eru (Ы ы; italics: Ы ы), usually called Y  in modern Russian or Yery or Ery historically and in modern Church Slavonic, is a letter in the Cyrillic script. It represents the close central unrounded vowel  (more rear or upper than i) after non-palatalised (hard) consonants in the Belarusian and Russian alphabets, and after any consonant in most of Rusyn standards, where it represents the unrounded close-mid back unrounded vowel sound.

The letter is usually romanised into English and most other West European languages as : Krylov (family name). That spelling matches Polish, which uses  to represent a very similar sound. Russian  is used to transliterate Polish  into Cyrillic: .

In most Turkic languages that use Cyrillic,  represents the close back unrounded vowel /ɯ/, like in Kazakh, Kyrgyz, etc.

Origin

Like many other Cyrillic letters, it was originally from a ligature  (which is represented in Unicode as Yeru with Back Yer), formed from Yer  and Dotted I  (formerly written either dotless or with two dots) or Izhe ( which formerly resembled ). The modern form  first occurred in South Slavic manuscripts following the loss of palatalization of word-final and preconsonantal consonants, so the letters  and  became confused; since the end of the 14th century,  came to be used in East Slavic manuscripts.

Usage

While vowel letters in the Cyrillic alphabet may be divided into iotated and non-iotated pairs (for example,  and  both represent , the latter denoting a preceding palatalised consonant),  is more complicated.

In Russian

In Ukrainian

In the Ukrainian alphabet, yery is not used since the language lacks the sound . In the Ukrainian alphabet, yery merged with [i] and was phased out in the second half of the 19th century.<ref>Hlushchenko, V. Yer, yery (ЄР, ЄРИ). Ukrainian Language. Encyclopedia (Izbornik).</ref> According to the Ukrainian academician Hryhoriy Pivtorak, the letter was replaced with so called "Cyrillic i" , which in Ukrainian represents the sound , which appeared by the merger of the earlier sounds [ɨ] and [i]. Yery could be found in several earlier versions of the Ukrainian writing system that were introduced in the 19th century among which were "Pavlovsky writing system", "Slobda Ukraine (New) writing system", and "Yaryzhka".

In Rusyn

In Turkic languages

The letter  is also used in Cyrillic-based alphabets of several Turkic and Mongolic languages (see the list) for a darker vowel .

In Tuvan, the Cyrillic letter can be written as a double vowel.

Related letters and other similar characters
И и : Cyrillic letter I
Й й : Cyrillic letter Short I
Ъ ъ : Cyrillic letter Yer
Ь ь : Cyrillic letter Soft sign
Ҍ ҍ : Cyrillic letter semisoft sign
Ѣ ѣ : Cyrillic letter yat
I ı : Latin letter Dotless I
Ь ь : Latin letter I with bowl
Ư ư : Latin letter U with horn, the 26th letter of the Vietnamese alphabet.
Y y : Latin letter Y

Computing codes

References

Russian: An interactive online reference grammar, by Dr Robert Beard

External links

Cyrillic ligatures